S. rosea may refer to:
 Sarracenia rosea, a newly named species from Sarracenia purpurea
 Scissurona rosea, a minute sea snail species
 Solanella rosea, the single species in the monotypic genus Solanella

See also
 Rosea (disambiguation)